WDEB (1500 AM, "98 The One") is a radio station broadcasting a Contemporary Christian music format. Licensed to Jamestown, Tennessee, United States, the station is currently owned by Baz Broadcasting, Inc. and features programming from Westwood One.

References

External links

DEB
Contemporary Christian radio stations in the United States
Radio stations established in 1968
1968 establishments in Tennessee
DEB